"Dreamboat Annie" is a song written and recorded by the rock band Heart.  It is the title track from their debut album Dreamboat Annie and was released as its third single in 1976.  The song had originally appeared as the B-side to Heart's debut single "Crazy on You" earlier that year.

"Dreamboat Annie" became Heart's third U.S. chart entry, peaking at number forty-two on the Billboard Hot 100.  Being markedly softer in sound than the other singles Heart had released previously, the song was also Heart's first entry onto the U.S. Adult Contemporary singles chart, where it reached number seventeen (Heart's highest-charting AC hit until "These Dreams" in 1986).

Versions
There are three different versions of the song "Dreamboat Annie" on the Dreamboat Annie album:
Track  2 – "Dreamboat Annie (Fantasy Child)" – 1:10
Track  5 – "Dreamboat Annie" – 2:02
Track 10 – "Dreamboat Annie (Reprise)" – 3:50
The version released on the single, a variation of Track 5, was listed on the 45 as 2:59. Assumed to increase the single's playtime to a more standard 3 minutes, the intro to its A-side "Crazy On You" was grafted onto the beginning of the song. The single version has yet to be released on any Heart album.

In 2011, Nancy Wilson recorded a reworked version of the song with American classical guitarist Sharon Isbin for the latter's album Guitar Passions.

Reception
Cash Box said "the tune is soft and melodic; a banjo plays quickly on backup" and "Ann & Nancy Wilson turn out some surefire harmonies." Billboard described "Dreamboat Annie" as "a pretty and poetic song filled with dreamlike sea lyric imagery and backed by near classical folk guitar and banjo runs."  Record World said that it "is not as immediate as 'Crazy On You' or 'Magic Man,' but it has an atmosphere and charm that should captivate listeners."

Personnel
Ann Wilson – lead vocals
Nancy Wilson – acoustic guitar, backing vocals
Steve Fossen – bass guitar
Howard Leese – bells

Additional musicians
Tessie Bensussen – backing vocals
Geoff Foubert – backing vocals
Jim Hill – backing vocals, banjo
Kat Hendrikse – drums

Charts

References

External links
 

Heart (band) songs
1976 singles
Songs written by Nancy Wilson (rock musician)
Songs written by Ann Wilson
Mushroom Records singles
1976 songs
Song recordings produced by Mike Flicker